Red Lodge is a city and county seat of Carbon County, Montana, United States.  As of the 2020 census, the population of the city was 2,257.

History
On September 17, 1851, the United States government signed a treaty with the Crow Nation, ceding the area which now contains Red Lodge, MT to the Crow Indians. Rich coal deposits were found there in 1866, and gold was discovered nearby in 1870. An 1880 treaty between the U.S. government and the Crow allowed the area to be settled starting April 11, 1882.

The Red Lodge post office was established on Dec 9, 1884 with Postmaster Ezra L. Benton. A rail line was constructed into town, and coal shipments began in June 1889. The boundaries of the Crow Reservation were redrawn October 15, 1892, opening the whole area to settlement. From then until the 1930s, coal mining defined the town.

In the late 19th century, many new settlers came to Red Lodge, MT. The majority came from Italy, the British Isles, Finland, Norway, Sweden, Germany, and Austria-Hungary. By the mid-1880s, migrants were still outnumbered by large numbers of Native Americans. By 1892 the population reached 1,180.

In 1896, Red Lodge had twenty saloons and, as the library records show, riotous and violent living was characteristic of the town. By 1906 the population had grown to 4,000 and by 1911 this had increased to 5,000.

Red Lodge suffered in the Great Depression, which forced many mines to close. To offset this downturn, the manufacture of illegal bootleg liquor, labeled syrup, became an economic mainstay and was sold as far away as Chicago and San Francisco.

In 1931 work began on the Beartooth Highway linking Red Lodge to Yellowstone National Park; it was officially opened in 1936.

In 1943 tragedy hit Smith Mine #3 near Bearcreek, the area's largest remaining mine. An explosion trapped and killed 74 men with only three of the workers in the mine that day escaping, making it the worst coal mine disaster in Montana's history. The mine was shut down shortly thereafter but was reopened in the late 1970s. The Red Lodge cemetery contains a memorial.

The downtown has been redeveloped since the mid-1980s for historic and cultural tourism, as the Red Lodge Commercial Historic District. The buildings in downtown Red Lodge fell into disrepair in large part because population had dropped from its 1915 peak of 6,000 people to about 2,000.

As of 2006, an estimate suggests that the population of Red Lodge may increase from about 1,200 people in the winter to over 1,800 people during the summer tourist season, arriving via the Beartooth Highway.

Red Lodge was heavily affected by the 2022 Montana floods.

Geography
Red Lodge is located at  (45.187515, -109.248475). U.S. Route 212 runs through the town. Rock Creek flows alongside Red Lodge. Grizzly Peak is one of several mountains surrounding Red Lodge.

Climate
Red Lodge experiences a continental climate (Köppen Dfb) with cold, somewhat dry winters and warm, wetter summers. Summers are cooler than in areas of Montana further north, due to the high elevation. Winters however, are milder than areas further to the east due to the chinook wind influence, as with most of Montana.

Demographics

Red Lodge is part of the Billings Metropolitan Statistical Area.

2010 census
As of the census of 2010, there were 2,125 people, 1,082 households, and 513 families residing in the city. The racial makeup of the city was 96.3% White, 0.4% African American, 0.6% Native American, 0.3% Asian, 0.1% Pacific Islander, 0.6% from other races, and 1.6% from two or more races. Hispanic or Latino of any race were 1.9% of the population.

There were 1,082 households, of which 19.5% had children under the age of 18 living with them, 35.6% were married couples living together, 8.2% had a female householder with no husband present, 3.6% had a male householder with no wife present, and 52.6% were non-families. 43.8% of all households were made up of individuals, and 14.4% had someone living alone who was 65 years of age or older. The average household size was 1.92 and the average family size was 2.62.

The median age in the city was 47.3 years. 16.8% of residents were under the age of 18; 6.4% were between the ages of 18 and 24; 22.8% were from 25 to 44; 34.4% were from 45 to 64; and 19.8% were 65 years of age or older. The gender makeup of the city was 49.4% male and 50.6% female.

2000 census
As of the census of 2000, there were 2,177 people, 1,020 households, and 528 families residing in the city. The population density was 846.0 people per square mile (327.1/km). There were 1,415 housing units at an average density of 549.9 per square mile (212.6/km). The racial makeup of the city was 96.14% White, 0.41% African American, 1.10% Native American, 0.46% Asian, 0.46% from other races, and 1.42% from two or more races. Hispanic or Latino of any race were 1.98% of the population.

There were 1,020 households, out of which 22.8% had children under the age of 18 living with them, 41.3% were married couples living together, 7.3% had a female householder with no husband present, and 48.2% were non-families. 39.8% of all households were made up of individuals, and 15.0% had someone living alone who was 65 years of age or older. The average household size was 2.04 and the average family size was 2.76.

In the city, the population was spread out, with 20.2% under the age of 18, 6.9% from 18 to 24, 28.6% from 25 to 44, 24.9% from 45 to 64, and 19.4% who were 65 years of age or older. The median age was 42 years. For every 100 females, there were 93.5 males. For every 100 females age 18 and over, there were 88.9 males.

The median income for a household in the city was $31,750, and the median income for a family was $40,260. Males had a median income of $30,250 versus $20,208 for females. The per capita income for the city was $19,090. About 6.9% of families and 9.7% of the population were below the poverty line, including 12.4% of those under age 18 and 9.3% of those age 65 or over.

Government
Red Lodge is the county seat of Carbon County and is an incorporated city, governed via the mayor/council system. There are six members of the city council, elected from one of three wards of roughly equal population. There are two council members from each ward. The mayor is elected in a citywide vote.

Education
Red Lodge is served by three public schools: Mountain View Elementary School, Roosevelt Middle School, and Red Lodge High School. They are known as the Rams.

Red Lodge Carnegie Library serves the area.

The Yellowstone Bighorn Research Association's Geology Field Station is located south of Red Lodge.

Outdoor recreation
Red Lodge is well known for many outdoor recreation opportunities: skiing, mountain biking, fly fishing, and backpacking are nearby.  In April it is host to a popular triathlon called the Peaks to Prairie.

Infrastructure
Red Lodge Airport is a public use airport located one mile (1.85 km) northwest of town.

Media

Radio
 KMXE FM 99.3

Newspapers
 Carbon County News (Weekly)
 The Local Rag (Monthly)
 Red Lodge Pickett (1892-1922)
 Red Lodge Pickett-Journal

Notable people
 Brady Canfield, Bronze medal winner in the 2003 FIBT World Championships in skeleton racing
 Kim Gillan, former Montana State Senator and 2012 candidate for the U.S. House of Representatives
 John Johnston was elected the first marshal in Red Lodge in 1888.
 Laurie Niemi, Washington Redskins offensive tackle
 Alice Greenough Orr, internationally renowned rodeo performer
 Gary D. Robson, author and closed captioning innovator
 Emily E. Sloan, lawyer and author
 K. Ross Toole, Montana historian

References

External links

 
 City website
 Red Lodge Area Chamber of Commerce

Cities in Carbon County, Montana
Billings metropolitan area
County seats in Montana
Cities in Montana